The Uniform Residential Landlord and Tenant Act, also known as URLTA, is a sample law governing residential landlord and tenant interactions, created in 1972 by the National Conference of Commissioners on Uniform State Laws in the United States.

Many states have adopted all or part of this Act.

See also
Landlord and Tenant Act

References

1972 in law
Landlord–tenant law
Residential Landlord Tenant Act
Real property law in the United States